Claude Michely (born 8 October 1959) is a Luxembourgish former cyclist, who competed as a professional from 1982 to 1992. He won the Luxembourgish National Road Race Championships in 1984 and 1985, and was also a 12-time national cyclo-cross champion, having held the title continuously from 1979 to 1990. He competed in the 1985 Vuelta a España and the 1984 Giro d'Italia, but did not finish either race. He also finished third at the 1985 UCI Cyclo-cross World Championships.

Major results

1977
 2nd Road race, National Junior Road Championships
1978
 1st  Road race, National Junior Road Championships
1984
 1st  Road race, National Road Championships
1985
 1st  Road race, National Road Championships
1987
 2nd Road race, National Road Championships
1988
 2nd Road race, National Road Championships

Cyclo-cross

1979
 1st  National Championships
1980
 1st  National Championships
1981
 1st  National Championships
1982
 1st  National Championships
1983
 1st  National Championships
1984
 1st  National Championships
1985
 1st  National Championships
 3rd  UCI World Championships
1986
 1st  National Championships
1987
 1st  National Championships
1988
 1st  National Championships
1989
 1st  National Championships
1990
 1st  National Championships

References

External links

1959 births
Living people
Luxembourgian male cyclists
Sportspeople from Esch-sur-Alzette
Cyclo-cross cyclists